An attack on a Central Reserve Police Force camp at Bemina, Srinagar, Jammu and Kashmir, India, occurred on 13 March 2013. It resulted in the death of five CRPF personnel and two attackers. Ten others were also injured include security personnels and civilians.

Attack
Two attackers entered Police Public School ground, where the CRPF camp was situated, in the morning. They were in the attire of cricket players with the sports kit. After they passed through security, they removed their jackets and took out granades and AK-47 assault rifles. The two suicide bombers opened indiscriminate firing on the CRPF camp. The shootout lasted 30 minutes.

Five CRPF men died and ten others were injured, including four civilians. The perpetrators were both killed by the CRPF personnel. Two AK-47 rifles, five magazines, two pistols and four grenades were recovered from attackers. A curfew was then imposed in Kashmir.

Aftermath
The separatist group Hizbul Mujahideen claimed responsibility for the attack.

Investigation
Two militants were arrested by Jammu and Kashmir police from Baramullah, Srinagar on 14 March 2013. Third suspect was arrested two days later who allegedly provide shelter to attackers.

Responsibility
NDTV suggested Hizbul Mujahideen was responsible for attack. Involvement of Lashkar-e-Taiba suspected.

Reactions

Domestic
The Government of India suspected the possible involvement of Pakistan. Sushilkumar Shinde, the home minister of India, said that the attackers who were killed had items (including ointment) that were manufactured in Pakistan and diaries with numbers in them of Pakistani origin. The Tamil Nadu government declared a relief of Rs500,000 to the family of a CRPF man who died in the attack. Omar Abdullah, the Chief Minister of Jammu and Kashmir, paid tribute to the dead soldiers. Later the India-Pakistan hockey series was cancelled. India also put the group visa facility for Pakistani tourists on hold.

International
  - The Ministry of Foreign Affairs denied any involvement of Pakistan in the attack.

See also
 June 2013 Srinagar attack
 2006 Srinagar bombings
 2001 Jammu and Kashmir legislative assembly attack

References

Mass shootings in India
Terrorist incidents in India in 2013
Srinagar
Mass murder in 2013
Attacks on military installations in the 2010s
March 2013 events in India
Attacks on buildings and structures in India
2013 mass shootings in Asia
2013 murders in India